is a manga written by Kizuku Watanabe and illustrated by Jo Aoto. The manga is a spin-off of Yūsei Matsui's Assassination Classroom that features the original cast of the original manga.

Plot
In the alternate universe set in an RPG world, the students of Kunugigaoka Junior High School are heroes under training and students of Class 3-E are those with bugs, making them weaker than other heroes. They are tasked to defeat Koro-sensei, an octopus-like creature, who intentionally teaches them so they can assassinate him one day.

Characters

Koro-sensei is a biological made monster who intentionally offered himself to be the teacher of Class 3-E so they could defeat him someday. He was once a hero who achieved everything and grew bored. Aguri Yukimura from Temple of Trade then offered him a position as a Demon King and the robe he wears gave him the yellow octopus-like appearance he has now. Even after becoming the Demon King, he was still bored since nobody could defeat him, hence the reason he wanted to teach Class 3-E.

Nagisa is one of the students in Class 3-E and the main student character. Unlike other students, Nagisa's bug is randomized, and ranges from making his body buffed to turning back the time without erasing anyone's memory. Due to his feminine face and figure, he is able to equip items meant for female characters.

Kaede is one of the students in Class 3-E who is often seen with Nagisa. She loves pudding and has a complex about her small chest (even treating it as her bug).

Karma is one of the students in Class 3-E, but initially appeared as a genius Red Devil who lived in a northern cave. His bug is when he is looking down at someone, his luck drops drastically, which stays true to his name. One of his notable bad lucks is when washtubs from nowhere hitting his head countless times. He joins Class 3-E after Koro-sensei "defeats" him.

Isogai is one of the students in Class 3-E, and the class representative who is labeled as the class' . Out of the students, he has the most different armor that is most "hero-ish" but because his family is poor, he only could afford the front half of his armor, although this is revealed to be his bug.

Terasaka is one of the students in Class 3-E, who has a big body and is the leader of 'rebel' clique in the class. In the anime, after a treasure box swaps his body, he is abandoned in the dungeon and trains until he eventually turns level 99 and becomes the strongest in the class. The fake version of him speaks English, and after the real Terasaka appeared, the fake one remains in Class 3-E.

Yuzuki is one of the students in Class 3-E, who is prone to breaking the fourth wall. She is connected to the plot in Koro Sensei Quest! and the main story, with nobody knowing what she does she talking about.

Kunudon is a species that serves as the most basic monster in the anime. It has a slime-like, orange-colored body with  a slender pair of hands and wears shoes, and a kettle hat on their heads.

Media

Manga
The series started its serialization in Japan in Shueisha's Saikyō Jump magazine on October 2, 2015. The first volume of the manga has been released on July 4, 2016. The manga finished on October 4, 2019.

Film
The manga received an anime film adaptation which premiered in Japan on November 19, 2016. It was animated by Lerche, the same studio that animated the two seasons of the original anime.

Anime
An anime series sequel adaption of Koro Sensei Quest! was announced consisting of twelve 10-minute episodes. It is a re-cut of the film. The opening theme titled "RE:QUEST!" is sung by Aya Suzaki under her character name Kaede Kayano, while the ending theme features a 8-bit version of the main series' first opening theme . Episode 10 features the main series' 4th ending,  sung by Kōtarō Takebayashi (Takahiro Mizushima). Crunchyroll streamed the series with Funimation providing the English Dub. Funimation began airing the English dub on January 12, 2017 with the original cast returning as their original characters.

Episode list

Notes

References

External links
  
 
 
 

Adventure anime and manga
Comedy anime and manga
Funimation
Lerche (studio)
Parody anime and manga
Shueisha franchises
Shueisha manga
Shōnen manga
Slice of life anime and manga